The Houlong River is a river in northwestern Taiwan. It flows through Miaoli County for 58 kilometers.

Bridges
 Xindong Bridge

See also
List of rivers in Taiwan

References

Landforms of Miaoli County
Rivers of Taiwan